Notre Dame High School is a private, Roman Catholic college-preparatory day school in Chattanooga, Tennessee. Founded in 1876, it is Chattanooga's oldest private school. The current campus, dedicated in 1966, is located in the Glenwood neighborhood adjacent to Memorial Hospital. Notre Dame was the first racially integrated high school in Chattanooga.

Alumni

Adarius Bowman
John C. Erickson
Chris Grabenstein
Dennis Haskins
Patrick Johnson
Reggie Mathis
Kareem Orr
Pez Whatley

References

Roman Catholic Diocese of Knoxville
Catholic secondary schools in Tennessee
Schools in Chattanooga, Tennessee
Educational institutions established in 1876
1876 establishments in Tennessee